Cnemaspis Stellapulvis is a species of diurnal, insectivorous, rock-dwelling gecko endemic to the Mysore Plateau of Karnataka in South India. It occurs only in an isolated hill range near Yadiyur of Mandya district and Tumkur district border.

References

 http://reptile-database.reptarium.cz/species?genus=Cnemaspis&species=stellapulvis
 https://www.inaturalist.org/taxa/Cnemaspis_stellapulvis

Reptiles of India
Reptiles described in 2020
stellapulvis
Endemic fauna of India